Level Loop is a historic home and farm located near Brownsburg, Rockbridge County, Virginia, USA. It was built about 1819 and is a two-story, five bay, brick Federal style dwelling. It has a side gable roof, exterior end chimneys and a moulded brick cornice. The property includes the contributing stone chimney of an early outdoor kitchen and an early-20th century bank barn and granary. The house was built for William Houston, a relative of the Texas pioneer and Rockbridge County native, Sam Houston.

It was listed on the National Register of Historic Places in 1993.

References

Houses on the National Register of Historic Places in Virginia
Farms on the National Register of Historic Places in Virginia
Federal architecture in Virginia
Houses completed in 1819
Houses in Rockbridge County, Virginia
National Register of Historic Places in Rockbridge County, Virginia
1819 establishments in Virginia